Henrike Naumann (born 1984 in Zwickau) is a German installation artist.

Life 
Naumann studied stage and costume design at the Dresden Academy of Fine Arts and scenography at the Konrad Wolf Film University of Babelsberg. She lives in Berlin.

After growing up in the youth culture of her home town that she describes as heavily dominated by Neonazis, she uses her installations to address the history of right-wing terrorism and the aesthetic of commonplace homes. She calls furniture the medium of her art. Through a rapidly expanding series of exhibitions, Naumann received significant media exposure in Germany. In addition to her artistic work she also lectures and teaches.

Works 
 Triangular Stories (2012) contrasts hedonistic and Neonazi youth culture in the Nineties
 Aufbau Ost (2016) considers the transformation of the GDR and the integration of East and West Germany using the aesthetics of everyday items
 Das Reich (2017) displays far-right ideology and the Reichsbürger movement symbolized in a spatial installation
 2000 (2018) relates the Expo 2000 to German reunification
 14 Words (2018) displays a former East German retail store referencing the National Socialist Underground that mostly murdered retail traders inside their own shops
 DDR Noir (2018) exhibits works of Naumann's own grandfather, the GDR graphical artist Karl Heinz Jakob amidst furniture of the period after reunification
 Eurotique (2018) at the Riga International Biennial of Contemporary Art
 Ostalgie (2019)

Solo exhibitions
 Generation Loss, with Freunde Aktueller Kunst, Zwickau (2013)
 Intercouture, Musée d'Art Contemporain et Multimédia Echangeur de Limete, Kinshasa, Democratic Republic of Congo (2016)
 2000, Museum Abteiberg, Mönchengladbach (2018)
 Das Reich, Belvedere 21, Wien
 LVZ-Kunstpreis, Museum der bildenden Künste, Leipzig (2019)

Publications
 Triangular Stories (2012)
 Henrike Naumann - The Effects Can Last Forever (2014)
 Texte zur Kunst #105 (2017)

Prizes, grants and residences
 Filmfest Dresden Public's Choice Award (2011)
 German Embassy, Port-au-Prince, Haiti (2015)
 Maroc Artist Meeting, Marrakesh, Marokko (2015)
 Residency of the Goethe Institute Kinshasa (2016)
 Global cultural exchange grant of the Senate of Berlin (2017)
 Karl Schmidt-Rottluff Stipendium (2018)
 Arts prize of the Leipziger Volkszeitung (2019)
 Max-Pechstein-Förderpreis (2019)

References

External links 
 Personal web site
 Henrike Naumann at KOW gallery

German installation artists
German women artists
German contemporary artists
1984 births
Living people